The Hamburg European Open (formerly German Open Tennis Championships) is an annual tennis tournament for professional players held in Hamburg, Germany and part of the Association of Tennis Professionals (ATP) Tour. Before 2021, it was a male-only event. 

The tournament is played on outdoor clay courts at the tennis center Am Rothenbaum in the Harvestehude quarter. For much of its history, the tournament was contested in May, as a precursor to the French Open on the professional tennis calendar. Starting with the 2009 tournament, it has been held in July instead.

The women's event was held initially separately from 1982 to 1983  (in Hittfeld), and again from 1987 through to 2002. It was part of the WTA Tour and existed under several different sponsored names, most commonly known as the Citizen Cup (1987–1995) and the Betty Barclay Cup (1999–2002). WTA Hamburg was the location where Monica Seles, then-world No.1, was stabbed during a match by a disorderly local tennis fan on April 30, 1993. In 2021, Hamburg returned to the calendar of the WTA tour, becoming part of its WTA 250 series category of tournaments.

History
The inaugural edition was held at the 'Eisenbahnverein auf der Uhlenhorst' (Uhlenhorst Railway Club) and was played in a best-of-three sets format. From the second edition in 1893 onward the tournament was a best-of-five sets until 2007 when it reverted (like other non Grand Slam events) to a best-of-three sets final. The first five editions, from 1892 to 1896, were exclusively open to German and Austrian players.

From 1898 to 1901 the German Championships were held in Bad Homburg vor der Höhe. A men's doubles event was added to the tournament in 1902. In 1924, the tournament permanently moved to the current location in Am Rothenbaum. The German Open was a combined men's and women's tournament up until 1979 when the WTA event was moved to West Berlin.

Men's 
The tournament joined the Grand Prix Tour from 1971 to 1989 with mixed importance. With the creation of the ATP Tour in 1990, the tournament was immediately classed as an ATP Masters Series event up until 2008. In 2009 the tournament was downgraded to an ATP Tour 500 event. According to tournament officials, this seriously hinders its ability to attract top-ranking players, who are more likely to participate in tournaments that earn them more points. Tournament officials sued the ATP in 2007 to stop the downgrade but a US jury decided in 2008 that it did not constitute a breach of monopoly laws. After a court-ordered mediation the tournament saw its appeal to the verdict rejected in 2010. As the tournament stands now with its new position in the ATP calendar, it is an attractive event for many players who dislike playing on faster surfaces. Its new position will prevent top-ranked players from playing there, since it is after Wimbledon and the focus moves towards preparing for the North American summer hardcourt surface before the start of the U.S. Open.

Women's
The German Championships were a combined men's and women's tournament held in Hamburg up until the women's event moved to West Berlin in 1979. The women's championships were established in 1896 and held 66 editions with the men's event before the decision to separate the two events. 

A new WTA Hamburg tournament was established in 1982, three years after the separation of the men's and women's German Open. This tournament was held the week prior to the men's German Open (whilst the women's German Open was held the week following the men's event in West Berlin). It existed as a lower tier tournament in 1982 and 1983 before a hiatus for three years. It was held in Hittfield. When the tournament then returned in 1987, it was held at Am Rothenbaum in September with German Steffi Graf winning the tournament. The German Open (men's) was held in late April to early May (with the women's event being held in Berlin from 11 May). In 1990 the tournament was promoted to Tier II status which it maintained until 2002 when the tournament was discontinued. 

It has been known by various names; the Casino Cup (1982), Fila Europa Cup (1983), Citizen Cup (1987–95), Rexona Cup (1996–97), Intersport Damen Grand Prix (1998), and Betty Barclay Cup (1999–2002). On April 30, 1993, Monica Seles, then-world No.1, was stabbed  by a disorderly local tennis fan during a quarterfinal match with Magdalena Maleeva. Seles never played in Germany again after the incident.

Between 2003 and 2020, no tournaments were held in Hamburg. Hamburg returned to the WTA calendar in 2021 after it secured license in the 250 series from the Baltic Open that was previously held in Jurmala, Latvia.

Steffi Graf holds the record for the most wins at WTA Hamburg, winning it six times consecutively from 1987–1992. She also finished runner-up a further two times.

Champions

Men's singles 
Key

Women's singles 
This section contains information of finals for WTA Hamburg (1982–2002) and Hamburg European Open (from 2021) only.For information regarding finals of the German Open that was held concurrently with the men's event up to and including 1978, please see German Open (WTA) Past finals. Men's doubles 
Key

 Women's doubles This section contains information of finals for WTA Hamburg (1982–2002) and Hamburg European Open (from 2021) only.
For information regarding finals of the German Open that was held concurrently with the men's event up to and including 1978, please see German Open (WTA) Past finals.

Records

See also

 WTA German Open
 Bavarian International Tennis Championships
 Stuttgart Open
 Women's Stuttgart Open
 Bad Homburg Open
 List of tennis tournaments

Notes

References

External links  
 Official tournament website
 ATP tournament profile
 2010 United States Court of Appeals verdict (PDF)

 
Tennis tournaments in Germany
Clay court tennis tournaments
Recurring sporting events established in 1892
ATP Tour 500
1892 establishments in Germany
Sports competitions in Hamburg
 
WTA Tour
Recurring sporting events established in 1982
Recurring sporting events disestablished in 2002
1982 establishments in West Germany
2002 disestablishments in Germany